Robert Duncan Whalley (born 17 October 1979) is an English cricketer. Whalley is a right-handed batsman who plays primarily as a wicketkeeper. He was born at Blackburn, Lancashire.

Whalley represented the Lancashire Cricket Board in a single List A match against Cheshire in the 1st round of the 2002 Cheltenham & Gloucester Trophy which was held in 2001. In his only List A match he scored 5 runs, while behind the stumps he took a single catch.

He currently plays club cricket for St Annes Cricket Club in the Northern Premier Cricket League.

References

External links
Duncan Whalley at Cricinfo
Duncan Whalley at CricketArchive

1979 births
Living people
Cricketers from Blackburn
English cricketers
Lancashire Cricket Board cricketers
Wicket-keepers